Eastern Washington is the region of the U.S. state of Washington located east of the Cascade Range. It contains the city of Spokane (the second largest city in the state), the Tri-Cities, the Columbia River and the Grand Coulee Dam, the Hanford Nuclear Reservation and the fertile farmlands of the Yakima Valley and the Palouse. Unlike in Western Washington, the climate is dry, including some desert environments.

Climate

A significant difference between Eastern Washington and the western half of the state is its climate. While the west half of the state is located in a rainy oceanic climate, the eastern half receives little rainfall due to the rainshadow created by the Cascade Mountains. Also, due to being farther from the sea, the east side has both hotter summers and colder winters than the west. Most communities in Eastern Washington, for example, have significant yearly snowfall, while in the west snowfall is minimal and not seen every year. The east and west do still have some climatic traits in common, though: more rainfall in winter than summer, a lack of severe storms, and milder temperature ranges than more inland locations.

There is some variation in both temperature and rainfall throughout Eastern Washington. Generally, lower elevations are both hotter and drier than higher elevations. This is easily seen in the comparison between low-elevation Richland with higher elevation Spokane.

Geography

Nomenclature
Other terms used for Eastern Washington or large parts of it include:
Columbia Basin
Eastside or east side of the state
Inland Empire/Inland Northwest (also includes the Idaho Panhandle)

Cities

The following cities and towns in Eastern Washington have over 10,000 inhabitants.

Spokane (pop. 217,300)
Spokane Valley (pop. 94,919)
Yakima (pop. 93,701)
Kennewick (pop. 80,280)
Pasco (pop. 71,680)
Richland (pop. 54,150)
Wenatchee (pop. 34,070)
Walla Walla (pop. 33,840)
Pullman (pop. 33,280)
Moses Lake (pop. 22,720)
Ellensburg (pop. 19,550)
Sunnyside (pop. 16,640)
West Richland (pop. 14,660)
East Wenatchee (pop. 13,600)
Cheney (pop. 11,880)
Grandview (pop. 11,170)

Protected areas

Hanford Reach National Monument
Lake Roosevelt National Recreation Area
Juniper Dunes Wilderness 
Salmo-Priest Wilderness
Wenaha-Tucannon Wilderness (partial)

Colville National Forest
Idaho Panhandle National Forest (partial)
Kaniksu National Forest (partial)
Okanogan–Wenatchee National Forest
Umatilla National Forest (partial)
Columbia National Wildlife Refuge
Conboy Lake National Wildlife Refuge
Little Pend Oreille National Wildlife Refuge
McNary National Wildlife Refuge
Saddle Mountain National Wildlife Refuge
Toppenish National Wildlife Refuge
Turnbull National Wildlife Refuge
Umatilla National Wildlife Refuge (partial)
Crawford State Park

Counties
Eastern Washington is composed of Adams, Asotin, Benton, Chelan, Columbia, Douglas, Ferry, Franklin, Garfield, Grant, Kittitas, Klickitat, Lincoln, Okanogan, Pend Oreille, Spokane, Stevens, Walla Walla, Whitman, and Yakima counties. Some definitions also include part of Skamania County that lies east of the ridge line of the Cascade Mountains.

Population
Compared to Western Washington, Eastern Washington has roughly twice the land area and one-fifth the population. According to the U.S. Census Bureau the population estimate as of July 2019 was 1,641,900. The population growth rate between the two is roughly the same. Of Washington's ten Congressional districts, Eastern Washington exactly encompasses two (the 4th and 5th), aside from a small portion of the 3rd in Skamania County.

Education

Eastern Washington hosts a number of universities including three of the state's five public universities.

Public institutions
Central Washington University
Eastern Washington University
Washington State University
A number of local community colleges including:
Big Bend Community College
Columbia Basin College
Spokane Community College
Spokane Falls Community College
Walla Walla Community College
Wenatchee Valley College
Yakima Valley College

Private institutions
Gonzaga University
Heritage University
Pacific Northwest University of Health Sciences
Walla Walla University
Whitman College
Whitworth University

Research institutions
Pacific Northwest National Laboratory
Chimpanzee and Human Communication Institute at Central Washington University

Proposed statehood

There have been sporadic movements to create a 51st state out of Eastern Washington by splitting the current state down the Cascades, but proposals have rarely progressed out of the state legislature's committees. Bills in the Washington State Legislature which would have requested the United States Congress to take up the question were proposed in 1996, 1999, 2005, and 2017. Proposed names for the new state have included Lincoln, Columbia, Liberty, or simply Eastern Washington. Many of these proposals would include the Idaho Panhandle as part of the proposed state of Lincoln.

Eastern Washington tends to vote Republican, whereas Western Washington usually votes Democratic, however Spokane, the proposed capital and largest city, tends to have a higher democratic vote than other Eastern Washington cities. Additionally, Whitman County votes Democratic.

Images

References

 
Regions of Washington (state)